OHL or Ohl may refer to:

Initialisms
Latvian Hockey Higher League, known in Latvian as the Optibet hokeja līga
Oberste Heeresleitung, the Supreme Army Command of Germany in World War I
Obrascón Huarte Lain, a Spanish construction company
Old Hill railway station's National Rail station code
Ontario Hockey League, one of the three Major Junior ice hockey leagues which constitute the Canadian Hockey League
Open Hardware License (disambiguation)
Oral hairy leukoplakia, a type of oral pathology
Oud-Heverlee Leuven, a Belgian football club
Overhead line, such as an overhead electric line used for railway and tram electric power supply
Ozburn-Hessey Logistics
Overhung Load, in regard to an electric motor it is the allowable radial load on the shaft of a motor, at a certain distance from the base of the shaft.

People
 Don Ohl, an American former NBA professional basketball player
 Maude Andrews Ohl (1862–1943), American journalist, poet, novelist
 Russell Ohl, an American crystal engineer recognized for patenting the modern solar cell

Places
 Ohl, Pennsylvania, an unincorporated community